Lakshmanpur Union is a Union Parishad under Sharsha Upazila of Jessore District in the division of Khulna, Bangladesh. It has an area of 27.14 square kilometres and a population of 25,630.

References

Unions of Sharsha Upazila
Unions of Jessore District
Unions of Khulna Division